United Bank for Africa Plc (UBA) is a Multinational pan-African financial services group headquartered in Lagos and known as Africa’s Global Bank. It has subsidiaries in 20 African countries and offices in London, Paris and New York. In December 2021, UBA received its banking license to commence operations in the UAE.   It is listed as commercial bank by the Central Bank of Nigeria. The shares of stock of the group are listed on the Nigerian Stock Exchange, where they trade under the symbol: UBA. The Group Chairman of the bank is Tony Elumelu and the GMD/CEO is Oliver Alawuba.

Current executives 
The table below shows the current Group Board of United Bank for Africa:

Overview
United Bank For Africa is a large financial services group in Nigeria and on the African continent. As of December 2021, the group's financial assets were valued at ₦8.5 trillion (US$20.1 billion), with shareholders' equity of ₦724.1 billion (US$1.8 billion). At that time the group employed 20,000+ people. The group maintains subsidiaries in Nigeria, Ghana, Benin, Ivory Coast, Burkina Faso, Guinea, Chad, Cameroon, Kenya, Gabon, Tanzania, Zambia, Uganda, Liberia, Sierra-Leone, Mozambique, Senegal, DR Congo, Congo Brazzaville, Mali, the United States of America, the United Kingdom, France, and UAE.

History
The British and French Bank Limited (BFB) commenced business in Nigeria in 1948. BFB was a subsidiary of Banque nationale pour le commerce et l'industrie (BNCI) in Paris, which transformed its London branch into BFB as a separate subsidiary. Banque Nationale de Credit and two British investment firms, S.G. Warburg and Company and Robert Benson and Company, held shares in BFB.  

Following Nigeria's independence from Britain, UBA was incorporated on 23rd, February 1961 to take over the business of BFB.  

In 1970, UBA listed its shares on the Nigerian Stock Exchange and became the first Nigerian Bank to undertake an Initial Public Offering (IPO).  

Today's UBA emerged from the merger of the dynamic and fast-growing Standard Trust Bank, incorporated in 1990, and UBA, one of the biggest and oldest banks in Nigeria. The merger was consummated on August 1, 2005, and was one of the largest mergers completed on the Nigerian Stock Exchange (NSE).   

Following the merger, UBA further expanded its brand through acquiring Continental Trust Bank that same year. In 2006, UBA acquired Trade Bank, which was under liquidation by the Central Bank of Nigeria at the time.

UBA had another successful combined public offering rights issue in 2007 and made further acquisitions of three liquidated banks: City Express Bank, Metropolitan Bank, and African Express Bank. UBA also acquired Afrinvest UK, rebranding it UBA Capital, UK. The quest to build a strong domestic and African brand intensified in 2008 when UBA made further acquisitions of two liquidated banks: Gulf Bank and Liberty Bank.  

UBA has a broad footprint across Africa and the world. It maintains subsidiaries in the following countries*, listed in the order of their commencement of banking operations: 

*UBA maintains a representative office in Paris, France.

Subsidiaries

The table below illustrates the locations and Group shareholding in the subsidiary banks of the UBA Group Plc.

References

External links

 BSL-Finance United Bank for Africa Profile

Banks established in 1949
Banks of Nigeria
Companies listed on the Nigerian Stock Exchange
1949 establishments in Nigeria
United Bank for Africa
Companies based in Lagos